The men's 3000 metres steeplechase competition at the 2016 Summer Olympics in Rio de Janeiro, Brazil was held at the Olympic Stadium between 15–17 August.

Summary
Continuing the country's unbeaten tradition in the Olympic steeplechase since 1968, the principal challengers to the gold medal came from the Kenyan team. Ezekiel Kemboi returned to defend his 2012 Olympic title and had won almost every global final since 2003. His sole loss came at the 2008 Beijing Olympics to another member of the team Brimin Kipruto. The third Kenyan was Conseslus Kipruto, who was the 2015 World Championships runner-up and held the top three times that season, having won all of the 2016 IAAF Diamond League meets. The next highest ranked entrant at sixth was Bahrain's John Kibet Koech (himself a former Kenyan). The 2012 Olympic runner-up Mahiedine Mekhissi-Benabbad was also present.

In the past Kemboi has sported the frohawk, but at the start line for the final, the 34-year-old man was sporting the reverse mohawk. His prince in training, Conseslus Kipruto has watched his act from behind in the previous two world championships as had many other men in this field. Conseslus made it clear from the gun that this was not going to be a strategic race, rushing to the lead. Returning silver medalist Mahiedine Mekhissi-Benabbad immediately moved to cover the lead, while Evan Jager ran around the outside of the pack to join them at the front 200 metres into the race. By the first barrier, the race was already a string, rather than a pack. Over the next lap, Conseslus pressed the pace, with only Jager following.  A gap opened back to the string of chasers, with Kemboi in the middle of the field. Through the next lap Jacob Araptany and Yemane Haileselassie trying to bridge the gap to Jager but also battling each other for the third position. 2008 gold medalist Brimin Kipruto moved up to join the challenge for third with Kemboi gliding along the inside to join the back of the leaders. The gap was disappearing. Suddenly at the last barrier before the end of the third lap, Araptany didn't appear to be prepared for the barrier, he just went down sliding under the barrier, his chin taking a knockout blow from the barrier with an audible crash. Following the next water jump, Jager moved past Conseslus, the pair tracked by Kemboi, Kenyan ex-pat Hillary Bor and Brimin.  With Jager now pushing the pace, the gap again began to form, with just Conseslus and Kemboi in the lead group.

Prefaced by the 2015 Steeplechase at Paris, Jager had learned he could beat the Kenyans by pushing the pace early. Here he was attempting to do just that. After another lap and a half of this, the gap grew back to fourth place Bor, with Brimin falling back and Mekhissi-Benabbad at the tail of the second group. With less than two laps to go Amor Ben Yahia in the middle of the second group fell over the barrier, leaving Soufiane El Bakkali, Brimin, Bor, Mekhissi-Benabbad and Yoann Kowal the remaining string of chasers. Jager held the lead to just before the bell. Over the penultimate water jump, Kemboi moved into the marking position, but after the following barrier, Conseslus gathered himself and sprinted by both. Kemboi chased Conseslus to the barrier before the backstretch, to be in the perfect position to launch his patented surge. But the surge was not there for Kemboi, instead it was Conseslus who made the surge down the backstretch. By the final water jump, the gap was insurmountable and Conseslus knew it. He began waving to the crowd. Conseslus ran the final straight, arms outstretched celebrating his victory (as Kemboi had done before him). Behind him, Jager was not done, executing his final kick around the beaten Kemboi on the home stretch and pulling away to the silver medal. Kemboi jogged across the finish line in third. Well behind, Mekhissi-Benabbad used the same kind of final lap that had brought him to two previous silver medals to beat the group of chasers to the line in fourth.

After the race was over, the French team filed a protest, claiming Kemboi had stepped off the track following the first water jump.  Video was reviewed of the race and the foul was detected, causing Kemboi to be disqualified, advancing Mekhissi-Benabbad to the bronze medal. That also made Mekhissi-Benabbad and not Kemboi, the first man to win three Olympic medals in the steeplechase.  This was Kenya's ninth straight and eleventh overall gold medal in the steeplechase. Jager was the first American to win a medal in the steeplechase since Brian Diemer in 1984.

After dominating the event, with two Olympic gold medals, four World Championship gold medals (and three silvers before that), Ezekiel Kemboi announced his retirement after the race, only to retract it and compete for one more year after realizing that he was disqualified.

The medals for the competition were presented by Aïcha Garad Ali, Djibouti, member of the International Olympic Committee, and the gifts were presented by Bernard Amsalem, Council Member of the IAAF.

Competition format
The men's 3000 m steeplechase competition consists of a heats stage (three races) and a final.

Schedule
All times are Brasilia Time (UTC-3)

Records
Prior to the competition, the existing World and Olympic records were as follows.

The following records were established during the competition:

Results

Heats

Heat 1

Heat 2

Heat 3

Final

References

Men's steeplechase
2016
Men's events at the 2016 Summer Olympics